Kim Ki-tae (born 1969) is a South Korean baseball coach.

Kim Ki-tae, Kim Ki-thae, or Kim Gi-tae may also refer to:
Kim Ki-tae (rower) (born 1952), North Korean rower